This article provides details of international football games played by the Angola national football team from 2020 to present.

Results

2020

2021

2022

2023

References

Football in Angola
Angola national football team results